Johannes Hippe (born 24 July 1990) is a Norwegian handball player for Lugi HF, in Sweden. He plays left and centre back, and is one of the best players on the team. His preferred jersey number is 4, which he wears on the Norwegian National team.

After two and a half season on Norway's top level and weeks of rumoring, Johannes officially signed for the French club HBC Nantes on 7 December 2011.

In October 2012, Hippe signed with Swedish club Lugi HF, where he scored 12 goals in his debut.

He is the son of Jon Hippe, and related to Ivar Hippe.

References 
http://www.handball.no/Lprofiler.asp?LagId=6012&ProfilId=46859
http://www.altomfotball.no/element.do?cmd=player&personId=232277&tournamentId=471
http://www.dagbladet.no/2011/01/03/sport/handball/handball-vm_i_sverige/handballgutta/14927526/
http://www.tv2.no/sport/handball/hippe-klar-for-lugi-3893624.html

1990 births
Norwegian male handball players
Living people
Handball players from Oslo
Lugi HF players